is a town located in Koyu District, Miyazaki Prefecture, Japan.

The town has an estimated population of 9,996 and the density of 98.0 persons per km². The total area is 102.11 km².

Geography

Neighbouring municipalities 

 Miyazaki Prefecture
 Hyuga
 Kawaminami
 Kijo

Transportation

Railway 

 JR Kyushu - Nippō Main Line
 Higashi-Tsuno - Tsuno

Highways 

 Higashikyushu Expressway
 Japan National Route 10

References

External links

Tsuno official website 

Towns in Miyazaki Prefecture